Hayateumi Hidehito (born July 5, 1975 as Naohito Saitō) is a former sumo wrestler from Aomori, Japan. His highest rank was sekiwake. He is now a Liberal Democratic Party politician.

Career
Born in Itayanagi, Kitatsugaru District, Hayateumi was an amateur sumo champion at Nihon University where he held the "College Yokozuna" title. Given makushita tsukedashi, or promising amateur status, he made his professional debut in the third makushita division in March 1998. He joined Tomozuna stable, but soon after followed Oitekaze Oyakata (the former Daishōyama) to the newly established Oitekaze stable.  He reached the second jūryō division in January 1999 and made his debut in the top makuuchi division in March 2000. In September 2000 he scored nine wins, winning the Gino-sho award and promotion to sekiwake. He had to pull out of the November 2000 tournament with an injury and never made the sanyaku ranks again. He is one of the few wrestlers whose only tournament in sanyaku was at sekiwake rather than komusubi (along with Kotetsuyama and Hokutoriki). Persistent injuries meant Hayateumi never realised his true potential, forcing him back down to the lower divisions. He announced his retirement in January 2006 at the rank of makushita 49. In all he had missed all or part of 12 of his 48 career tournaments through injury.

Retirement from sumo
Hayateumi had his danpatsu-shiki, or official retirement ceremony, in October 2006. He chose not to stay with the Sumo Association as an elder and has left the sumo world. He is now a Liberal Democratic Party politician, and was elected to the Aomori Prefectural Assembly representing Kitatsugaru District in a by-election in September 2014, winning re-election in 2015 and 2019.

Personal life
He is married to Endo Ako, who already had three children of her own. They have since had another child together. Endo was previously engaged to Mitoizumi.

Fighting style
Hayateumi was a yotsu-sumo wrestler, who preferred fighting on the mawashi to pushing his opponents, and his most common winning kimarite was yori-kiri, a simple force out. His favourite grip was migi-yotsu, with his right hand inside and left hand outside his opponent's arms. He was known for occasionally leaping in the air at the tachi-ai or initial charge, a very unconventional move.

Career record

See also
List of sumo tournament second division champions
Glossary of sumo terms
List of past sumo wrestlers
List of sekiwake

References

External links
 

1975 births
Living people
Japanese sportsperson-politicians
Japanese sumo wrestlers
Politicians from Aomori Prefecture
Sumo people from Aomori Prefecture
Members of the Aomori Prefectural Assembly
Sekiwake
Nihon University alumni